In biology, taxonomic rank is the relative level of a group of organisms (a taxon) in an ancestral or hereditary hierarchy. A common system of biological classification (taxonomy) consists of species, genus, family, order, class, phylum, kingdom, domain. While older approaches to taxonomic classification were phenomenological, forming groups on the basis of similarities in appearance, organic structure and behaviour, methods based on genetic analysis have opened the road to cladistics.

A given rank subsumes under it less general categories, that is, more specific descriptions of life forms. Above it, each rank is classified within more general categories of organisms and groups of organisms related to each other through inheritance of traits or features from common ancestors. The rank of any species and the description of its genus is basic; which means that to identify a particular organism, it is usually not necessary to specify ranks other than these first two.

Consider a particular species, the red fox, Vulpes vulpes: the specific name or specific epithet vulpes (small v) identifies a particular species in the genus Vulpes (capital V) which comprises all the "true" foxes. Their close relatives are all in the family Canidae, which includes dogs, wolves, jackals, and all foxes; the next higher major rank, the order Carnivora, includes caniforms (bears, seals, weasels, skunks, raccoons and all those mentioned above), and feliforms (cats, civets, hyenas, mongooses). Carnivorans are one group of the hairy, warm-blooded, nursing members of the class Mammalia, which are classified among animals with backbones in the phylum Chordata, and with them among all animals in the kingdom Animalia. Finally, at the highest rank all of these are grouped together with all other organisms possessing cell nuclei in the domain Eukarya.

The International Code of Zoological Nomenclature defines rank as: "The level, for nomenclatural purposes, of a taxon in a taxonomic hierarchy (e.g. all families are for nomenclatural purposes at the same rank, which lies between superfamily and subfamily)."

Main ranks 
In his landmark publications, such as the Systema Naturae, Carl Linnaeus used a ranking scale limited to kingdom, class, order, genus, species, and one rank below species. Today, the nomenclature is regulated by the nomenclature codes. There are seven main taxonomic ranks: kingdom, phylum or division, class, order, family, genus, and species. In addition, domain (proposed by Carl Woese) is now widely used as a fundamental rank, although it is not mentioned in any of the nomenclature codes, and is a synonym for dominion (lat. dominium), introduced by Moore in 1974.

A taxon is usually assigned a rank when it is given its formal name. The basic ranks are species and genus. When an organism is given a species name it is assigned to a genus, and the genus name is part of the species name.

The species name is also called a binomial, that is, a two-term name. For example, the zoological name for the human species is Homo sapiens. This is usually italicized in print or underlined when italics are not available. In this case, Homo is the generic name and it is capitalized; sapiens indicates the species and it is not capitalized.

Ranks in zoology
There are definitions of the following taxonomic ranks in the International Code of Zoological Nomenclature: superfamily, family, subfamily, tribe, subtribe, genus, subgenus, species, subspecies.

The International Code of Zoological Nomenclature divides names into "family-group names", "genus-group names" and "species-group names". The Code explicitly mentions the following ranks for these categories:

Superfamily

Family
Subfamily
Tribe
Subtribe

Genus
Subgenus

Species
Subspecies

The rules in the Code apply to the ranks of superfamily to subspecies, and only to some extent to those above the rank of superfamily. Among "genus-group names" and "species-group names" no further ranks are officially allowed. Zoologists sometimes use additional terms such as species group, species subgroup, species complex and superspecies for convenience as extra, but unofficial, ranks between the subgenus and species levels in taxa with many species, e.g. the genus Drosophila. (Note the potentially confusing use of "species group" as both a category of ranks as well as an unofficial rank itself.)

At higher ranks (family and above) a lower level may be denoted by adding the prefix "infra", meaning lower, to the rank.  For example, infraorder (below suborder) or infrafamily (below subfamily).

Names of zoological taxa
 A taxon above the rank of species has a scientific name in one part (a uninominal name).
 A species has a name composed of two parts (a binomial name or binomen): generic name + specific name; for example Canis lupus.
 A subspecies has a name composed of three parts (a trinomial name or trinomen): generic name + specific name + subspecific name; for example Canis lupus italicus. As there is only one possible rank below that of species, no connecting term to indicate rank is needed or used.

Ranks in botany
According to Art 3.1 of the International Code of Nomenclature for algae, fungi, and plants (ICN) the most important ranks of taxa are: kingdom, division or phylum, class, order, family, genus, and species. According to Art 4.1 the secondary ranks of taxa are tribe, section, series, variety and form. There is an indeterminate number of ranks. The ICN explicitly mentions:

primary ranks
secondary ranks
further ranks

kingdom (regnum)
subregnum

division or phylum (divisio, phylum)
subdivisio or subphylum

class (classis)
subclassis

order (ordo)
subordo

family (familia)
subfamilia
tribe (tribus)
subtribus

genus (genus)
subgenus
section (sectio)
subsection
series (series)
subseries

species (species)
subspecies
variety (varietas)
subvarietas
form (forma)
subforma

There are definitions of the following taxonomic categories in the International Code of Nomenclature for Cultivated Plants: cultivar group, cultivar, grex.

The rules in the ICN apply primarily to the ranks of family and below, and only to some extent to those above the rank of family. Also see descriptive botanical name.

Names of botanical taxa
Taxa at the rank of genus and above have a botanical name in one part (unitary name); those at the rank of species and above (but below genus) have a botanical name in two parts (binary name); all taxa below the rank of species have a botanical name in three parts (an infraspecific name). To indicate the rank of the infraspecific name, a "connecting term" is needed. Thus Poa secunda subsp. juncifolia, where "subsp." is an abbreviation for "subspecies", is the name of a subspecies of Poa secunda.

Hybrids can be specified either by a "hybrid formula" that specifies the parentage, or may be given a name. For hybrids receiving a hybrid name, the same ranks apply, prefixed with notho (Greek: 'bastard'), with nothogenus as the highest permitted rank.

Outdated names for botanical ranks 
If a different term for the rank was used in an old publication, but the intention is clear, botanical nomenclature specifies certain substitutions:
 If names were "intended as names of orders, but published with their rank denoted by a term such as": "cohors" [Latin for "cohort"; see also cohort study for the use of the term in ecology], "nixus", "alliance", or "Reihe" instead of "order" (Article 17.2), they are treated as names of orders.
 "Family" is substituted for "order" (ordo) or "natural order" (ordo naturalis) under certain conditions where the modern meaning of "order" was not intended. (Article 18.2)
 "Subfamily is substituted for "suborder" (subordo) under certain conditions where the modern meaning of "suborder" was not intended. (Article 19.2)
 In a publication prior to 1 January 1890, if only one infraspecific rank is used, it is considered to be that of variety. (Article 37.4) This commonly applies to publications that labelled infraspecific taxa with Greek letters, α, β, γ, ...

Examples
Classifications of five species follow: the fruit fly familiar in genetics laboratories (Drosophila melanogaster), humans (Homo sapiens), the peas used by Gregor Mendel in his discovery of genetics (Pisum sativum), the "fly agaric" mushroom Amanita muscaria, and the bacterium Escherichia coli. The eight major ranks are given in bold; a selection of minor ranks are given as well.

Table notes
In order to keep the table compact and avoid disputed technicalities, some common and uncommon intermediate ranks are omitted. For example, the mammals of Europe, Africa, and upper North America are in class Mammalia, legion Cladotheria, sublegion Zatheria, infralegion Tribosphenida, subclass Theria, clade Eutheria, clade Placentalia – but only Mammalia and Theria are in the table. Legitimate arguments might arise if the commonly used clades Eutheria and Placentalia were both included, over which is the rank "infraclass" and what the other's rank should be, or whether the two names are synonyms.
The ranks of higher taxa, especially intermediate ranks, are prone to revision as new information about relationships is discovered. For example, the flowering plants have been downgraded from a division (Magnoliophyta) to a subclass (Magnoliidae), and the superorder has become the rank that distinguishes the major groups of flowering plants. The traditional classification of primates (class Mammalia, subclass Theria, infraclass Eutheria, order Primates) has been modified by new classifications such as McKenna and Bell (class Mammalia, subclass Theriformes, infraclass Holotheria) with Theria and Eutheria assigned lower ranks between infraclass and the order Primates. See mammal classification for a discussion. These differences arise because there are few available ranks and many branching points in the fossil record.
Within species further units may be recognised. Animals may be classified into subspecies (for example, Homo sapiens sapiens, modern humans) or morphs (for example Corvus corax varius morpha leucophaeus, the pied raven). Plants may be classified into subspecies (for example, Pisum sativum subsp. sativum, the garden pea) or varieties (for example, Pisum sativum var. macrocarpon, snow pea), with cultivated plants getting a cultivar name (for example, Pisum sativum var. macrocarpon 'Snowbird'). Bacteria may be classified by strains (for example Escherichia coli O157:H7, a strain that can cause food poisoning).

Terminations of names
Taxa above the genus level are often given names based on the type genus, with a standard termination. The terminations used in forming these names depend on the kingdom (and sometimes the phylum and class) as set out in the table below.

Pronunciations given are the most Anglicized.

Table notes
 In botany and mycology names at the rank of family and below are based on the name of a genus, sometimes called the type genus of that taxon, with a standard ending. For example, the rose family, Rosaceae, is named after the genus Rosa, with the standard ending "-aceae" for a family. Names above the rank of family are also formed from a generic name, or are descriptive (like Gymnospermae or Fungi).
 For animals, there are standard suffixes for taxa only up to the rank of superfamily. Uniform suffix has been suggested (but not recommended) in AAAS as -ida  for orders, for example; protozoologists seem to adopt this system. Many metazoan (higher animals) orders also have such suffix, e.g. Hyolithida and Nectaspida (Naraoiida).
 Forming a name based on a generic name may be not straightforward. For example, the  has the genitive , thus the genus Homo (human) is in the Hominidae, not "Homidae".
 The ranks of epifamily, infrafamily and infratribe (in animals) are used where the complexities of phyletic branching require finer-than-usual distinctions. Although they fall below the rank of superfamily, they are not regulated under the International Code of Zoological Nomenclature and hence do not have formal standard endings. The suffixes listed here are regular, but informal.
 In virology, the formal endings for taxa of viroids and of satellite nucleic acids are similar to viruses, only -vir- is replaced by -viroid-, -satellit-.

All ranks 
There is an indeterminate number of ranks, as a taxonomist may invent a new rank at will, at any time, if they feel this is necessary. In doing so, there are some restrictions, which will vary with the nomenclature code which applies.

The following is an artificial synthesis, solely for purposes of demonstration of relative rank (but see notes), from most general to most specific:
 Domain or Empire
 Subdomain (biology)
 Realm (in virology)
 Subrealm (in virology)
 Hyperkingdom
 Superkingdom
 Kingdom
 Subkingdom
 Infrakingdom
 Parvkingdom
 Superphylum, or superdivision (in botany)
 Phylum, or division (in botany)
 Subphylum, or subdivision (in botany)
 Infraphylum, or infradivision (in botany)
 Microphylum
 Superclass
 Class
 Subclass
 Infraclass
 Subterclass
 Parvclass
 Superdivision (in zoology)
 Division (in zoology)
 Subdivision (in zoology)
 Infradivision (in zoology)
 Superlegion (in zoology)
 Legion (in zoology)
 Sublegion (in zoology)
 Infralegion (in zoology)
 Supercohort (in zoology)
 Cohort (in zoology)
 Subcohort (in zoology)
 Infracohort (in zoology)
 Gigaorder (in zoology)
 Magnorder or megaorder (in zoology)
 Grandorder or capaxorder (in zoology)
 Mirorder or hyperorder (in zoology)
 Superorder
 Series (in Ichthyology)
 Order
 Parvorder (position in some zoological classifications)
 Nanorder (in zoology)
 Hypoorder (in zoology)
 Minorder (in zoology)
 Suborder
 Infraorder
 Parvorder (usual position), or microorder (in zoology)
 Section (in zoology)
 Subsection (in zoology)
 Gigafamily (in zoology)
 Megafamily (in zoology)
 Grandfamily (in zoology)
 Hyperfamily (in zoology)
 Superfamily
 Epifamily (in zoology)
 Series (for Lepidoptera)
 Group (for Lepidoptera)
 Family
 Subfamily
 Infrafamily
 Supertribe
 Tribe
 Subtribe
 Infratribe
 Supergenus
 Genus
 Subgenus
 Section (in botany)
 Subsection (in botany)
 Series (in botany)
 Subseries (in botany)
 Species complex
 Species
 Subspecies, or forma specialis (for fungi), or pathovar (for bacteria))
 Variety or varietas (in botany); or form or morph (in zoology) or aberration (in lepidopterology)
 Subvariety (in botany)
 Form or forma (in botany)

Significance and problems 
Ranks are assigned based on subjective dissimilarity, and do not fully reflect the gradational nature of variation within nature. In most cases, higher taxonomic groupings arise further back in time: not because the rate of diversification was higher in the past, but because each subsequent diversification event results in an increase of diversity and thus increases the taxonomic rank assigned by present-day taxonomists. Furthermore, some groups have many described species not because they are more diverse than other species, but because they are more easily sampled and studied than other groups.

Of these many ranks, the most basic is species. However, this is not to say that a taxon at any other rank may not be sharply defined, or that any species is guaranteed to be sharply defined. It varies from case to case. Ideally, a taxon is intended to represent a clade, that is, the phylogeny of the organisms under discussion, but this is not a requirement.

A classification in which all taxa have formal ranks cannot adequately reflect knowledge about phylogeny. Since taxon names are dependent on ranks in traditional Linnaean systems of classification, taxa without ranks cannot be given names. Alternative approaches, such as using circumscriptional names, avoid this problem. The theoretical difficulty with superimposing taxonomic ranks over evolutionary trees is manifested as the boundary paradox which may be illustrated by Darwinian evolutionary models.

There are no rules for how many species should make a genus, a family, or any other higher taxon (that is, a taxon in a category above the species level). It should be a natural group (that is, non-artificial, non-polyphyletic), as judged by a biologist, using all the information available to them. Equally ranked higher taxa in different phyla are not necessarily equivalent (e.g., it is incorrect to assume that families of insects are in some way evolutionarily comparable to families of mollusks). For animals, at least the phylum rank is usually associated with a certain body plan, which is also, however, an arbitrary criterion.

Mnemonic
There are several acronyms intended to help memorise the taxonomic hierarchy, such as "King Phillip came over for great spaghetti". See taxonomy mnemonic.

See also
 Breed
 Catalogue of Life (a database)
 Cladistics
 Landrace
 Tree of life (biology)

Footnotes

References

Bibliography

 
 Benton, Michael J. 2005. Vertebrate Palaeontology, 3rd ed. Oxford: Blackwell Publishing. . 
 Brummitt, R.K., and C.E. Powell. 1992. Authors of Plant Names. Royal Botanic Gardens, Kew. 
 Carroll, Robert L. 1988. Vertebrate Paleontology and Evolution. New York: W.H. Freeman & Co. 
 Gaffney, Eugene S., and Peter A. Meylan. 1988. "A phylogeny of turtles". In M.J. Benton (ed.), The Phylogeny and Classification of the Tetrapods, Volume 1: Amphibians, Reptiles, Birds, 157–219. Oxford: Clarendon Press.
 Haris Abba Kabara. 2001. Karmos hand book for botanical names.
 Lambert, David. 1990. Dinosaur Data Book. Oxford: Facts on File & British Museum (Natural History). 
 McKenna, Malcolm C., and Susan K. Bell (editors). 1997. Classification of Mammals Above the Species Level. New York: Columbia University Press. 
 Milner, Andrew. 1988. "The relationships and origin of living amphibians". In M.J. Benton (ed.), The Phylogeny and Classification of the Tetrapods, Volume 1: Amphibians, Reptiles, Birds, 59–102. Oxford: Clarendon Press.
 Novacek, Michael J. 1986. "The skull of leptictid insectivorans and the higher-level classification of eutherian mammals". Bulletin of the American Museum of Natural History 183: 1–112.
 Sereno, Paul C. 1986. "Phylogeny of the bird-hipped dinosaurs (Order Ornithischia)". National Geographic Research 2: 234–56.
 Willis, K.J., and J.C. McElwain. 2002. The Evolution of Plants. Oxford University Press. 

Botanical nomenclature
Plant taxonomy
R
Biology terminology